Ginger tea is a herbal beverage that is made from ginger root. It has a long history as a traditional herbal medicine in East Asia, South Asia, Southeast Asia, and West Asia.

Regional variations and customs 

Ginger tea can be drunk by itself, or served alongside traditional accompaniments, such as milk, orange slices, or lemon.

East Asia

China 
In the Tang dynasty, tea was flavoured to counteract the bitter taste. Ginger was favoured among tea drinkers, in addition to onion, orange peel, cloves, and peppermint.

Japan 
In Japan, it is called shōgayu (生姜湯).

Korea 
In Korea, ginger tea is called saenggang-cha. It can be made either by boiling fresh ginger slices in water or mixing ginger juice with hot water. Sliced ginger preserved in honey, called saenggang-cheong, can also be mixed with hot water to make ginger tea. Nowadays, powdered instant versions are also widely available. When served, the tea is often served garnished with jujubes and pine nuts. When using fresh ginger, the tea can be sweetened with honey, sugar, or other sweeteners according to taste. Garlic, jujubes, and pear are sometimes boiled along with ginger.

Southeast Asia

Brunei, Malaysia, Singapore 
In Brunei, Malaysia and Singapore cuisines, ginger tea is usually called teh halia. It is not a pure ginger tea, as it is brewed of strong sweetened black tea, ginger rhizome, sugar with milk or condensed milk.

Indonesia 
In Indonesia, it is called teh jahe. In Java, a local version of ginger tea enriched with palm sugar and spices called wedang jahe is more popular.

Wedang Jahe is a type of Indonesian ginger tea. Wedang in Javanese means "hot beverage" while jahe means "ginger". Although devoid of any caffeine content, it is often served and enjoyed as an invigorating tea. It is made from the ginger rhizome, usually fresh and cut in thin slices, and palm sugar or granulated cane sugar, frequently with the addition of fragrant pandan leaves. Palm sugar can be substituted with brown sugar or honey. Traditionally people might add spices such as lemongrass, cloves, and cinnamon stick.

Milk, either fresh or condensed, might be added.

Philippines 
In the Philippines, it is called salabat and is traditionally made simply with peeled and thinly sliced or crushed raw ginger boiled for a few minutes in water. Sugar, honey, and calamansi are added to taste, along with other flavoring ingredients as desired. Modern versions can also use ground ginger powder (often called "instant salabat") added to hot boiling water. Native ginger varieties (which are small and fibrous) are preferred, as they are regarded as being more pungent than imported varieties.

Salabat is usually served in the relatively cold month of December. Along with tsokolate (traditional hot chocolate), it is usually paired with various native rice cakes (kakanin) like bibingka or puto bumbong. Salabat is traditionally sold by early morning street vendors during the Simbang Gabi (dawn mass) of the Christmas season.

Salabat is also widely consumed as a throat-soothing remedy for cough, sore throat, and common colds. Drinking salabat is widely believed to improve a person's singing voice.

A variant of salabat that exclusively or partially use turmeric is known as dulaw, duwaw, or duyaw in the Visayas and Mindanao islands; and tsaang dilaw (literally "yellow tea") in Filipino.

South Asia

India 

In India, ginger tea is known as Adrak ki chai and is a widely consumed beverage. It is made by grating ginger into brewed black tea along with milk and sugar. Another commonly used version is ginger lemon tea which is prepared by adding ginger root to lukewarm lemon juice.

See also 

 Ginger ale
 Ginger beer
 Traditional Korean tea
 Bajigur
 Bandrek
 List of hot beverages
 List of Indonesian beverages
 Tisane (herbal tea)

References 

Tea
Bruneian cuisine
Chinese drinks
Herbal tea
Hot drinks
Indian drinks
Indonesian drinks
Japanese drinks
Javanese cuisine
Korean tea
Malaysian drinks
Malaysian tea
Philippine drinks
Singaporean drinks
Taiwanese drinks